The 2016 British Rowing Senior Championships were the 45th edition of the National Senior Championships, held from 22–23 October 2016 at the National Water Sports Centre in Holme Pierrepont, Nottingham. They were organised and sanctioned by British Rowing, and are open to British rowers.

Medal summary

References

British Rowing Senior Championships
British Rowing Senior Championships
British Rowing Senior Championships